"The Exiles" is a science fiction short story by Ray Bradbury. It was originally published as "The Mad Wizards of Mars" in Maclean's on September 15, 1949 and was reprinted, in revised form, the following year by The Magazine of Fantasy & Science Fiction. First collected in The Illustrated Man (1951), it was later included in the collections R Is for Rocket (1962), Bradbury Stories: 100 of His Most Celebrated Tales (2003), A Sound of Thunder and Other Stories (2005) and A Pleasure to Burn (2010, under the "Mad Wizards" title and presumably with the Maclean's text).

Plot summary
Circa the year 2020, the planet Earth contrived to ban and outlaw the books of supernaturalist authors such as H.P. Lovecraft, Edgar Allan Poe, Algernon Blackwood and Ambrose Bierce. A century later in the year 2120, the dying crew of an interplanetary rocket-ship is headed for the planet Mars. The crew is plagued by needle-sharp pains and nightmarish visions and dreams, caused by the incantations and magical fires of the martian Exiles -- the banned authors Shakespeare, Blackwood, Bierce, Lovecraft and Poe, and their literary characters -- who are fearfully aware of the approaching rocket. The Exiles are already fading from existence because the people of Earth have burned nearly all their books.  The Exiles soon learn that the rocket captain is carrying away from Earth the very last copies of the forbidden books that survived the conflagration. In desperation, Poe and Bierce attempt to entreat Charles Dickens to negotiate with the rocket crew once it arrives, but the pompous Dickens bitterly resents his inclusion among mere fantasy and supernatural writers, and rejects Poe's request. The rocket crew does arrive, but finds only a few flickering signs that Mars might have been inhabited by the Exiles. Seeking to forever banish the 'supernatural' plague before they colonize Mars, the rocket ship's crew burn the books that the captain has brought with him, thus consigning the Exiles to oblivion.

Adaptations
"The Exiles" was adapted to the Eclipse comic book Alien Encounters No. 10 (December 1986) by Tom Sutton.

Reception
Author and literary critic Gore Vidal admired Bradbury and this story in particular, calling it "a good short story" and saying that it represented Bradbury "at his best".

Related stories

Bradbury also wrote of similar futures where books were banned, with references to Poe and other authors, in the short stories "Pillar of Fire" and "Usher II" (1950), and the novel Fahrenheit 451.

The Three Witches from Shakespeare's Macbeth appear at the beginning of the story. Similar characters reappear in another of Bradbury's short stories, "The Concrete Mixer," also dealing with Mars, and they provided the title of Bradbury's novel, Something Wicked This Way Comes.

Despite its Martian setting the 1950 version of this Mars tale is set in the year 2167 (later adjusted to 2120, as various story timelines became better aligned). It is thus not a formal part of Bradbury's famous collection The Martian Chronicles which ends in the year 2057.

References

External links
 

Science fiction short stories
Short stories by Ray Bradbury
1949 short stories
Short stories set on Mars
Works originally published in Maclean's
Cultural depictions of Edgar Allan Poe
Cultural depictions of Charles Dickens
Cultural depictions of William Shakespeare